BET Nightly News is the main newscast of the Black Entertainment Television network. The newscast covered national and international news stories from a black perspective.

The program ran for four years, ending in July 2005. The nightly newscast was replaced by a new format, which included hourly updates and on-line supplements.

Past anchors of the newscast included Michelle Miller and Jacque Reid. The executive producer of the program was Will J. Wright.

References

External links
 
 BET Nightly News Names New Executive Producer
 BET's Nightly News Makes Way for New Format

BET original programming
2001 American television series debuts
2000s American television news shows
2005 American television series endings
African-American news and public affairs television series